Asclepias tuberosa, commonly known as butterfly weed, is a species of milkweed native to eastern and southwestern North America. It is commonly known as butterfly weed because of the butterflies that are attracted to the plant by its color and its copious production of nectar.

Description

They each have five petals and five sepals. It is uncertain if reddish flowers are due to soil mineral content, ecotype genetic differentiation, or both. A cultivar named 'Hello Yellow' typically has more yellowish flowers than ordinary examples of this plant.

Similar species 
The plant looks similar to the lanceolate milkweed (Asclepias lanceolata), but is uniquely identified by the larger number of flowers, and the hairy stems that are not milky when broken. It is most commonly found in fields with dry soil.

Taxonomy

Subspecies 
Asclepias tuberosa subsp. interior – (Central United States, Ontario and Quebec)
Asclepias tuberosa subsp. rolfsii – Rolfs milkweed (Southeastern United States)
Asclepias tuberosa subsp. tuberosa – (Eastern United States)

Common names 
Common names include butterfly weed, Canada root, chieger flower, chiggerflower, fluxroot, Indian paintbrush, Indian posy, orange milkweed, orange root, orange Swallow-wort, pleurisy root, silky swallow-wort, tuber root, yellow milkweed, white-root, windroot, butterfly love, butterflyweed, and butterfly milkweed.

Distribution and habitat 
The species can be found from South Dakota south to Texas and Mexico, west to Utah and Arizona, as well as many other areas further east.

This plant favors dry, sand or gravel soil, but has also been reported on stream margins. It requires full sun.

Ecology
Most easily propagated by seed. The primary pollinators are bees and wasps, rather than butterflies. Sown outdoors after frost, a plant will flower and produce seed in the third year.  It is difficult to transplant once established, as it has a deep, woody taproot.

A. tuberosa is a larval food plant of the queen and monarch butterflies, as well as the dogbane tiger moth, milkweed tussock moth, and the unexpected cycnia. Because of its rough leaves, it is not a preferred host plant of the monarch butterfly but caterpillars can be reared on it successfully. Further, it is one of the very lowest Asclepias species in cardenolide content, making it a poor source of protection from bird predation and parasite virulence and perhaps contributing to its lack of attractiveness to egg-laying monarchs.

Cultivation 
To protect seeds from washing away during heavy rains and from seed–eating birds, one can cover the seeds with a light fabric or with an  layer of straw mulch. However, mulch acts as an insulator. Thicker layers of mulch can prevent seeds from germinating if they prevent soil temperatures from rising enough when winter ends. Further, few seedlings can push through a thick layer of mulch.

In cultivation in the greenhouse, plants can easily be grown from seed to flowering in as little as three to six months. The seeds often need periods of cold treatment (cold stratification) before they will germinate.

Toxicity
The plant contains toxic glycosides, alkaloids and resinoids. These can cause weakness, seizures and corneal injuries. Use of the plant is contraindicated in pregnancy, during lactation or with infants due to its toxins, which include resinoids and pregnanes.

Because monarch butterflies do not favor it when reproducing, it is not as suitable for use in butterfly gardens and monarch waysides as are other milkweed species.

Uses 
Native Americans and European pioneers used the boiled roots to treat diarrhea and respiratory illnesses. The young seed pods were used as food after being boiled in several changes of water. The seed pod down was spun and used to make candle wicks.

The root was once used to treat pleurisy.

Gallery

References

Further reading

External links

 
 
 Butterfly weed brief information and pictures
 Missouri Botanical Garden Asclepias tuberosa
 Photo of a J.J. Audubon Plate Clay-Colored Sparrow perched atop Asclepias tuberosa

tuberosa
Butterfly food plants
Flora of Canada
Flora of the Eastern United States
Garden plants of North America
Plants described in 1753
Plants used in traditional Native American medicine
Taxa named by Carl Linnaeus